Viviane Käser (born 10 May 1985) is a Swiss former competitive figure skater. She is the 2007 International Challenge Cup bronze medalist and a two-time Swiss national silver medalist (2002, 2008). She qualified to the free skate at the 2008 European Championships and finished 23rd.

Programs

Competitive highlights 
JGP: Junior Grand Prix

References

External links
 

1985 births
Living people
People from Aarau
Swiss female single skaters
Sportspeople from Aargau